A snowball is a mixture of advocaat and a carbonated lemonade in approximately equal parts. It may have other ingredients, to taste.

It typically contains a squeeze of fresh lime juice, which is shaken with the advocaat before pouring into a glass and topping up with lemonade.

See also
 List of lemonade topics
 List of lemon dishes and beverages

References

Cocktails with liqueur
Lemonade
Cocktails with advocaat